Drobiny is a rural locality (a village) in Klenovskoye Selsoviet, Bolshesosnovsky District, Perm Krai, Russia. The population was 37 as of 2010. There is 1 street.

Geography 
Drobiny is located on the Cheptsa River, 36 km northwest of Bolshaya Sosnova (the district's administrative centre) by road. Malye Kizeli is the nearest rural locality.

References 

Rural localities in Bolshesosnovsky District